Laurie Sargent is best known as a songwriter and vocalist in the 1980s and 1990s.  She was active in the city of Boston. Around 2008, she and her long-term partner, drummer Billy Conway, moved to Montana, where they began raising food on an organic farm. Sargent occasionally visits various cities to perform.

Collaborations 
 Jim Steinman
 Holly Sherwood
 Mark Sandman

Bands 

 Fire, Inc., a group performing some of the soundtrack of the 1984 movie Streets of Fire
 Nowhere Fast
 Morphine
 Face to Face, a new wave band from Boston
 Twinemen
 Hi-n-Dry
 If You Were a Woman (And I Was a Man)
 Confrontation
 One Big Day
 Session Americana
 Dana Colley

References

External links 

 https://www.lauriesargentart.com/
 

American singer-songwriters
Year of birth missing (living people)
Living people